= China Along the Yellow River =

Non-fiction book by Cao Jinqing

- Author: Cao Jinqing
- Original title: 黃河邊的中國 — — 個學者對鄉村社會的觀察與思考
- Translator: Nicky Harman; Huang Ruhua
- Genre: Travel
- Publisher: RoutledgeCurzon
- Publication date: 2004
- Pages: 254
- ISBN: 9780415341134
- OCLC: 55068063

China Along the Yellow River: Reflections on Rural Society (Chinese: 黃河邊的中國 — — 個學者對鄉村社會的觀察與思考) is a 2004 non-fiction book by Cao Jinqing.

A pioneering work of Chinese sociology, it explores modern China with a modern face. In 2011, China Along the Yellow River was voted one of the 100 greatest non-fiction books by The Guardian.
